The balete tree (also known as balite or baliti) are several species of the trees in the Philippines from the genus Ficus that are broadly referred to as balete in the local language.  A number of these are known as strangler figs wherein they start upon other trees, later entrapping them entirely and finally killing the host tree. Also called hemiepiphytes, initially, they start as epiphytes or air plants and grow several hanging roots that eventually touch the ground and from then on, encircling and suffocating the host tree. Some of the baletes produce an inferior quality of rubber.  The India rubber plant, F. elastica were earlier cultivated to some extent for rubber.  Some of the species like tangisang-bayawak or Ficus variegata are large and could probably be utilized for match woods.  The woods of species of Ficus are soft, light, and of inferior quality, and the trees usually have ill-formed, short boles.

List of species which shares the common name of Balete

F. arayatensis Warb.
F. balete Merr.
F. benjamina Linn.
F. benjamina Linn. var. nuda Miq.
F. clusioides Miq.
F. concinna Miq.
F. elastica Roxb.
F. forstenii Miq.
F. indica Linn.
F. parvifolia Miq.
F. payapa Blanco
F. philipinenses Miq.
F. retusa Linn.
F. stipulosa Miq. Linn.
F. variegata Blume

Ornamental use
Baletes are planted as graceful trees along avenues in Manila and other large cities in the Philippines, and they are also excellent as shade trees.  Several species of the tree are also use for bonsai making in the country.

Baletes are used as houseplants; however, it is a source of indoor household allergens which may cause respiratory allergy.

Local folklore

In some areas of the country, some people believe that balete trees are dwelling places for supernatural beings (anito) like diwata, kapre or tikbalang.  In some places, sorcery rituals are known performed inside the chambers formed by the tree.  Also among others, some superstitious folks suggest not bringing in balete as decorative plants inside a house as they allegedly invite ghosts.

Balete Drive in New Manila, Quezon City, named after a gargantuan balete tree that used to stand in the middle of the street, is allegedly one of the most haunted places in the city.  The tale of a white lady appears at night hailing cars that drive by have been circulated since the 1950s.

Extreme examples
 The balete tree inside the OISCA Farm in Lumapao, Canlaon, Negros Oriental, Philippines, is estimated by botanists from Silliman University to be around 1,328 years old. It would take at least 42 men to encircle its trunk. At the heart of this wide tree trunk is a cavity where lizards, bats and many insects have made it their home. With fireflies lighting it at night like a year-round Christmas tree, it is one of the city's main tourist attraction.
 A balete tree locally called "Millenium Tree" in Barangay Quirino, Maria Aurora, Aurora province in the Philippines is claimed to be the largest of its kind in Asia. It is possible for adult people to squeeze into the center of its root network.
 A 400-year-old balete tree in Barangay Campalanas in the town of Lazi, in Siquijor province is believed to be the oldest and the biggest in the province. What is also unusual about this tree is the spring that emanates from the base of the tree and flows straight into a man-made pool.

Gallery

See also

 Bodhi tree
 Kodama (spirits in Japanese folklore)
 Peepal tree (ficus religiosa)
 Tree spirit
 Yorishiro (spirits-attracting object)

References

External links

 "The Forests of the Philippines" by the Philippine Bureau of Forestry from Google Books.

 
Flora of the Philippines
Trees of the Philippines
Paranormal places in the Philippines
Plant common names
Austronesian spirituality